Tervel Venkov Pulev is a Bulgarian professional boxer. He has held the WBA International cruiserweight title since December 2019 and previously the European Union cruiserweight title in 2018.

Early life 
Pulev was born on 10 January 1983 in Sofia, Bulgaria, the youngest son of Hristina and Venko Pulev. He grew up in a big family, one of five children – 3 sisters, and he is the younger brother of professional boxer Kubrat Pulev. As children, the two brothers were trained by their father, who was convinced his sons would succeed in boxing. As a role model their father not only involved them in boxing, but he also influenced them about loving history, reading books and being patriots.

Amateur career 
Pulev’s first club was CSKA, he won many times the national championship for junior, youth and men. Pulev joins the Bulgarian national representative team and in 1998 participates for the first time in the Youth European Championship in Jurmala, Latvia. During the years he had to defend his presence in the representative team, remaining undefeated from another Bulgarian boxer for the period from 2004 to 2016.

In 2010 Pulev won the silver medal at the European Championship in Moscow, Russia. Same year he participated in the European Cup Tournament in Kharkiv, Ukraine. At the final of the tournament he lost to Oleksandr Usyk. In 2011 Pulev won again the silver medal at the European Championship in Ankara, Turkey. In 2015 Pulev won the bronze medal at the European Championship in Samokov, Bulgaria after he lost to Evgeny Tishchenko at the semi-finals.

During his career we won many golden medals and cups at international tournaments held in: Mostar (2004), Spain (2006), Serbia (2008, 2010, 2011), Dagestan (2009), Bulgaria – Strandja Cup (2011, 2014), Albania (2012), Turkey (2012).

The Tournament in Trabzon, Turkey has been from significant importance for Pulev as it was the last Olympic qualification for Europe zone, by winning Pulev caught the last chance to take the only left quota for the 2012 Summer Olympics

At this Olympic games Pulev won the bronze medal, one of the two Bulgarian olympic medals. Pulev defeated Wang Xuanxuan and Yamil Peralta which secured him a medal. At the semi-finals Pulev lost to Oleksandr Usyk, who won the gold medal.

Pulev was awarded Boxer of the Year in Bulgaria for three consequent years 2010, 2011 and 2012. He has also been nominated three times for Sportsman of the year.

International Tournaments

Professional career
Pulev made his professional debut on 3 December 2016 at Arena Armeec in Sofia, in the Main-Event of a card featuring Kubrat Pulev’s win of the World Boxing Association Inter-Continental Heavyweight Title against Samuel Peter, beating Tomislav Rudan by a TKO. Pulev won the following seven fights by KO/TKO in the early rounds. His ninth fight took place in Germany against Valery Brudov and this was the first time for Pulev not to break down the opponent in the very first rounds, but to win by points (Unanimous decision) after the last round. The next three fights took place in Austria, USA and Bulgaria – all three won by KO/TKO. The bout in Bulgaria took place in Arena Armeec on 27 October 2018 and this was Pulev’s first title fight – he won the vacant EBU European Union Cruiserweight Title defeating Leonardo Bruzzese by KO. March 2019 was the second time for Pulev to win by points and Unanimous decision against Mitch Williams in USA at the Hangar, Costa Mesa. December 14, 2019 as the main event holder Pulev, outworked and outboxed American cruiserweight Deshon Webster to unanimous decision in Plovdiv, Bulgaria. In this 12 rounds fight Pulev won the WBA International cruiserweight title.

Professional boxing record

Personal life
Tervel Pulev has two sons Kaloyan (born in 2008) and Asparuh (born in 2016) with Diana Nenova, Bulgarian volleyball player and member of the national team.

Pulev has a Мaster’s degree graduate of the National Sports Academy (NSA), in 2019 he decided to enroll in the PhD program of the Academy. In 2018 Pulev became Master of Laws, graduating from Sofia University "St. Kliment Ohridski ". Pulev owns a sport center called "Sport Center Pulev" located in Sofia.

References 

1983 births
Living people
Sportspeople from Sofia
Heavyweight boxers
Light-heavyweight boxers
Boxers at the 2012 Summer Olympics
Olympic boxers of Bulgaria
Olympic bronze medalists for Bulgaria
Olympic medalists in boxing
Medalists at the 2012 Summer Olympics
Big Brother (Bulgarian TV series) contestants
Bulgarian male boxers